There are multiple uses for the term Golden Chain:
Golden chain is the common name for the genus Laburnum, and related species of small trees with decorative yellow flowers.
Hadith of Golden Chain, a hadith (tradition) narrated from the eighth Shia Imam 
Order of the Golden Chain, name of a number of secret societies
The Golden Chain, an alleged group of al Qaeda's wealthy sponsors
Golden Chain Highway, another name for State Route 49 in California, United States
Golden Chain of Homer, a 1723 hermetical book edited by Anton Josef Kirchweger 
A Golden Chain, or The Description of Theology, a 1591 book by the Puritan William Perkins (theologian)
"Golden Chain", a song by Stars, from the compilation album Exclaim! 13th Anniversary Cross-Canada Concert Series
 The Golden Chain (Di goldene keyt), a 1907 Yiddish-language play by I.L. Peretz
 The Golden Chain (Di goldene keyt (magazine)), the leading Yiddish-language literary journal of the post-World War II era